The Croatian Publishing and Bibliographic Institute (HIBZ) was a lexicographic institute in the Independent State of Croatia founded on August 9, 1941. Mate Ujević was its director. In 1944, Dragutin Tadijanović became the literary secretary of the institute. With the creation of communist Yugoslavia in 1945, the institute's work was stopped.

People associated with the Institute include Ivan Goran Kovačić.

The Institute published the Dictionary of Croatian Literary Language, as well as taking over the publishing of the Croatian Encyclopedia. In 1942, the institute published seven of Vladimir Nazor's works: Putopisi, Zagrebačke novele, Posljednja Trijada, Na vrh jezika i pera, Arhanđeli, Knjiga pjesama and Eseji i članci.

Published works

Contemporary Croatian Writers series
The HIBZ published a series of anthologies titled Contemporary Croatian Writers (Suvremeni hrvatski pisci):
Book 1: Tuga zemlje, Dragutin Tadijanović (1942)
Book 2: Izabrani stihovi, Dobriša Cesarić (1942)
Book 3: Pjesme I., Đuro Sudeta (1943)
Book 4: Pjesme II., Đuro Sudeta (1943)
Book 5: Kritike i članci,  (1943)
Book 6: Kritike i prikazi, Milan Begović (1943)
Book 9: Za kasnim stolom, Nikola Šop (1943)
Book 10: Tajanstvena prela, Nikola Šop (1943)
Book 12: Pjesme, Ljubo Wiesner (1943)
Book 18: Pripoviesti, Janko Leskovar (1944)

Fran Galović
Drame 1 (1903–1906), Fran Galović. Zagreb, 1942.
Drame 2 (1907), Fran Galović. Zagreb, 1942.
Drame 3 (1908), Fran Galović. Zagreb, 1942.
Drame 4 (1908–1911), Fran Galović. Zagreb, 1942.
Drame 5 (1912–1913), Fran Galović. Zagreb, 1942.
Pjesme 2, Fran Galović. Zagreb, 1942.
Pripovijesti 1 (1903–1912), Fran Galović. Zagreb, 1942.
Pripovijesti 2 (1912–1914), Fran Galović. Zagreb, 1942.
Članci i kritike (1902–1914), Fran Galović. Zagreb, 1942.

Other books
Dioba vlasti, Ivo Krbek. Zagreb, 1943.
Prošlost Dalmacije I–II., Grga Novak. Zagreb, 1944.
Tamnica vremena, Gustav Krklec. Zagreb, 1944.

Periodicals
Croatia, 1941–1944
Književni tjednik
Književni tjednik ("Literary Weekly") was a literary and cultural magazine. Its Editor-in-Chief was Pavao Tijan. In six months, between 18 December 1941 and 28 June 1942, 21 issues were published, initially weekly and later biweekly. The magazine's topics were literature, newly released books, theater, concerts, fine arts, and photography. Foreign literature and writers, such as Albanian, Belgian, Bengali, Norwegian and French, received coverage too. The magazine published a number of poems and pieces of short prose by contemporary Croatian writers, including Tin Ujević, Vladimir Nazor, Ivan Goran Kovačić and Vjekoslav Kaleb. It was discontinued in 1942, ostensibly due to a "shortage of paper". According to Mate Ujević, the real reason was an unspecified article deemed "anti-fascist" by the regime. It appears that the authorities decided to extinguish Književni tjednik in order to set the stage for Spremnost, a political weekly closely aligned with Ustasha ideology.  During the communist era in post-World War II Yugoslavia, Književni tjednik was not available for academic research.

Časopis za hrvatsku poviest
Časopis za hrvatsku poviest ("Journal of Croatian History") was the first exclusively historical journal in Croatian historiography. It covered only topics related to history and art history of Croatia. Four issues in three volumes were published in 1943.

Vienac
After the demise of Književni tjednik, HIBZ started Vienac ("The Wreath"), a monthly magazine that continued the tradition of Vienac, a publication of Matica ilirska established in 1869 and discontinued before World War I. Between March and July 1944, 12 issues were published in 6 volumes. Although Vienac was predominantly a literary magazine, it covered a wide range of topics, including fine arts, philosophy, economy, and natural sciences. Some articles attracted public criticism in pro-regime publications, which, according to Mate Ujević, nearly led to HIBZ being terminated.

Časopis za medicinu i biologiju (Acta medico-biologica croatica)
Acta was envisioned as a quarterly medical journal, but only a single issue was published in early 1945. Its editor was Juraj Körbler, and the chairman of its editorial board was Ante Šercer.

References

Bibliography

 
 
 
 
 
 

Linguistic research institutes
Research institutes in Croatia
1941 establishments in Croatia
1945 disestablishments in Croatia
Independent State of Croatia